Slemen (Serbian Cyrillic: Слемен) is a mountain in eastern Serbia, near the town of Knjaževac. Its highest peak  has an elevation of 1,099 meters above sea level.

References

Mountains of Serbia